Begon or Bégon may refer to:

Persons
 , bishop of Nîmes 943-946
 Michel Bégon (1638–1710), French naturalist and administrator after whom begonias were named
 Michel Bégon de la Picardière, his son; an intendant of New France
 Claude-Michel Bégon de la Cour, French colonial officer in Quebec
 Antoinette Begon, wife of Étienne Pascal
 Beggo, Count of Toulouse, Count of Paris. Also known as "Begon", "Beggon" etc.

Places
 Begon or Begon II, a Sara iron mining/ironworks site in Chad
 Causse-Bégon, a commune in the Gard department in southern France